The Leeton District Lands Office is a heritage-listed administration office located at Chelmsford Place, Leeton in the Leeton Shire local government area of New South Wales, Australia. It was designed by J. M. S. Woore of the Water Conservation and Irrigation Commission and built in 1937. It is also known as the Water Conservation and Irrigation Commission. The property is owned by Department of Planning and Infrastructure, a department of the Government of New South Wales. It was added to the New South Wales State Heritage Register on 2 April 1999.

History 
The building was built to provide offices for the Water Conservation and Irrigation Commission at Leeton in 1937. It was designed by J. M. S. Woore, an engineer under the Chief Engineer, F. Brewster, of the Water Conservation and Irrigation Commission.

Description 
Leeton DLWC District Office is situated opposite the famous historic Leeton Hydro Hotel on the high ground of Leeton city. The building is part single- and part two-storey high, with a basement level on the south-western side. There is a new extension at the north-western corner. The building is of the Art-deco style, with symmetrical front elevation in stepped silhouette. The front facade features emphatic vertical piers and horizontal parallel lines, with concentration of ornament on upper part of the building. The monumental entrance is of textured face brickwork, with double sets of ornate double doors. The external windows are metal-framed. Internally, many of the original joinery and ornamental features remain intact. There is a central stairway with terrazo steps leading up to the upper floor. The rendered walls and ceiling are ornamented with stylised low-relief motif which is typical of the Art Deco style building. Many of the glazed office partition walls and doors appear to be original.

Condition 

As at 8 December 2000, the building is in good condition generally.

Modifications and dates 
, the north-western section of the building was extended and refurbished.

Further information 

Seek heritage advice prior to planning any future work or development. Preparation of a Conservation Plan and Maintenance Plan should form part of conveyancing document in case of future disposal of the property.

Heritage listing 
As at 6 December 2000, the former Leeton Water Conservation and Irrigation Commission Office is associated with the historical development of Leeton township, and the administration of the Water Conservation & Irrigation Commission. It is a good example of an Art Deco Office building and contributes to the streetscapes and townscapes of Leeton. The building is held in esteem by local community for its link with the provision of irrigation water and of employment.

The Leeton District Lands Office was listed on the New South Wales State Heritage Register on 2 April 1999.

See also 

Leeton District Office artefacts

References

Bibliography

Attribution 

New South Wales State Heritage Register
Leeton, New South Wales
Office buildings in New South Wales
Articles incorporating text from the New South Wales State Heritage Register
Government buildings completed in 1937
1937 establishments in Australia
Art Deco architecture in New South Wales
Water management in New South Wales